Diagnosis: Unknown is an American medical drama that aired on CBS television from July 5 to September 20, 1960. The series aired as a summer replacement for The Garry Moore Show from 10 to 11 p.m. on Tuesdays.

Premise
Daniel Coffee, head of a hospital's pathology lab, worked with police (particularly Detective Captain Max Ritter) to find criminals who committed bizarre murders. Lab assistants Doris Hudson and Motilal Mookerju supported Coffee in his work. Another regular character was Link, a boy who worked as handyman and kept the lab clean.

Personnel 
The cast was as follows:

 Patrick O'Neal as Coffee
 Phyllis Newman as Hudson
 Cal Bellini as Mookerji
 Martin Huston as Link
 Chester Morris as Ritter

Bob Banner was the producer.

Joel Carpenter wrote the script for the program's premiere episode.

Theme
"Coffe's Theme", the program's theme song, was recorded by Warren Covington and the Tommy Dorsey Orchestra (Decca 31146).

Critical reception
In a review of the program's initial episode in The New York Times, Jack Gould called the show "sick television" and said it indicated that "beatniks have taken over" at CBS. The review said that the show's "laboratory is populated by gone kids" and noted elements in the laboratory's environment: "haze of cigarette smoke . . . the din of transistor radios . . . jive talk".

Critic John Crosby wrote that he liked the emphasis on the mystery, and he complimented O'Neal's portrayal of Coffee. He liked the dialogue's "intelligence and flashes of humor" but added that some scenes were "awfully talky" while others were "pretty awkward".

Episodes

References

External links
 

1960 American television series debuts
1960 American television series endings
1960s American medical television series
1960s American drama television series
Black-and-white American television shows
CBS original programming
Television series by CBS Studios
Television shows set in New York City